To India - My Native Land is a poem by Indian poet Henry Louis Vivian Derozio, published in 1828 as part of his book The Fakeer of Jungheera: A Metrical Tale and Other Poems. It is one of the most notable works by Derozio.

The poem has been identified by historians as containing some of the first written examples of Indian nationalism, with the poem extolling "patriotism and a love of freedom".

Summary

Derozio's poem elates at length of his view on the state of India under the rule of the East India Company, writing that compared to "thy day of glory past" the country has now been "chained down at last", and is reduced to "grovelling in the lowly dust". Despite this, Derozio writes that India may rise again and "bring from out the ages that have rolled".

Major themes
The themes of the poem concern primarily nationalism and patriotism. Derozio writes of the "past glory" of India and how the country that was once  "worshipped as a deity" has been chained down to the lowest depths. Derozio writes about some of that heritage of the distant past and in return hopes for a "kind wish" from the country and its people.

The poem uses the image of a golden bird, thus hinting at the past glory of India as imagined by Derozio. Words such as "halo", "deity", "worship" elevate the nation to the imagined height and then words such as "chained", "grovelling", and "lowly dust" sharply contrast the current state of the country. The misery and lament of the poet invites the reader to join in his sorrow. Historians have written that Derozio was influenced by the Romantic-era poetry of Byron and Southey.

Style
The poem is a Petrarchan sonnet with a rhyme scheme of ABABABCC DEDEFF. The poem shows influences of Romantic poets.

References

Indian poems
1828 poems